The Long March 2D, also known as the Chang Zheng 2D, CZ-2D and LM-2D, is a Chinese two-stage orbital carrier rocket mainly used for launching LEO and SSO satellites. It is manufactured by the Shanghai Academy of Spaceflight Technology (SAST).

It is mainly launched from areas LA-2B and LA-4 at the Jiuquan Satellite Launch Center. The Long March 2D made its maiden flight on 9 August 1992. It was initially used to launch FSW-2 and FSW-3 reconnaissance satellites.

Unlike all other members of the Long March 2 rocket family, the Long March 2D is a two-stage version of the Long March 4 launch vehicle.

Launch statistics

List of launches 

The Long March 2D made its maiden flight on 9 August 1992.

References

External links 
 
 

Long March (rocket family)
Vehicles introduced in 1992